Christian or Cristian Rivera may refer to:
 Christian Rivera (Spanish footballer) (born 1997), Spanish football defensive midfielder
 Christian Rivera (Colombian footballer) (born 1996), Colombian football midfielder
 Cristian Rivera (weightlifter) (born 1963), Dominican Republic weightlifter